James Szalapski (October 4, 1945 – September 6, 2000) was a professional screenwriter, cinematographer, producer, and director, born in St. Paul, Minnesota, but who worked in New York City.  His works include many documentaries, most notably Heartworn Highways, a 1975 documentary on several country music artists.  He was the principal live-action special effects cinematographer for R/Greenberg Associates years starting in 1979. His notable work includes the classic Alien theatrical teaser (1979), the after-life scene in the 1980 film Resurrection, the opening title sequence in The World According to Garp (1982), and scenes from Ladyhawke working with Vittorio Storaro (1985).

He is survived by his wife Deirdre, his brother Kevin and his nephew Patrick.

References

External links
 

American male screenwriters
American film producers
American film directors
1945 births
2000 deaths
20th-century American businesspeople
20th-century American male writers
20th-century American screenwriters